John Alexander Gunn (1896–1975) was a philosopher who earned his Ph.D. from the University of Liverpool and worked there as a fellow. He went on to be appointed as a professor at the University of Melbourne in 1923 and retired in 1938. His successor as Director of Extension was Colin R. Badger.

Writings

 Bergson and His Philosophy (1920)
 Modern French Philosophy: a Study of the Development Since Comte (1922)
 Wealth (1924)
 Benedict Spinoza (1925)
 Livelihood (1927)
  The Problem of Time: An Historical & Critical Study (1929)
 Spinoza, The Maker Of Lenses (1932)

External links
 Bergson and His Philosophy (1920) E-Book
 Modern French Philosophy (1922) E-Book
 
 

1896 births
1975 deaths
20th-century British philosophers
Philosophers of time
Academic staff of the University of Melbourne
British expatriates in Australia